The Sarawak Chinese Association (SCA) was a political party in the Sarawak state of Malaysia.

History
The party was established in July 1962 by a group of mostly English-educated Chinese businessmen, with the leaders largely from Kuching and Sibu. Based on the Malayan Chinese Association, its membership was limited to ethnic Chinese residents of Sarawak and the aim of its founders was to present a less radical Chinese viewpoint than that offered by the Sarawak United Peoples' Party (SUPP).

A member of the Sarawak branch of the Alliance Party, it won two seats in the 1969 general elections, and two of the three seats it contested in the 1970 state elections.

The party was dissolved in 1973 as a result of an agreement between the Alliance and the SUPP.

Election results

General elections

State elections

References

Defunct political parties in Sarawak
1962 establishments in North Borneo
Political parties established in 1962
1973 disestablishments in Malaysia
Political parties disestablished in 1973